The Intruder is a 1975 American horror film written and directed by  Chris Robinson and starring Mickey Rooney, Ted Cassidy, and Yvonne De Carlo. Its plot follows a group of people who are stalked on an island by a killer while searching for gold.

The film was shelved by its distribution company in 1975, never receiving a theatrical or home video release, and was thought to be a lost film. In 2017, it was announced that a print of the film had been discovered. The film had its first release on Blu-ray by Garagehouse Pictures on August 1, 2017.

Cast
Chris Robinson as Reardon
Mickey Rooney as Captain Jennings
Yvonne De Carlo as DePriest
Phyllis Robinson
Ted Cassidy'

See also
List of rediscovered films

References

External links

1975 films
1975 horror films
American slasher films
Films set on uninhabited islands
1970s rediscovered films
Rediscovered American films
1970s English-language films
1970s American films